The discography of Escape the Fate, an American rock band, includes seven studio albums, three extended plays, one demo, twenty-eight singles, and twenty-eight music videos.

Studio albums

Extended plays

Singles

Album appearances

Music videos

Other Appearances

Notes

References

External links

Rock music group discographies
Discographies of American artists
Discography